Several special routes of U.S. Route 19 exist. In order from south to north they are as follows.

Existing

St. Petersburg–Holiday alternate route

Alternate U.S. Route 19 is the  former section of U.S. Route 19 from St. Petersburg, Florida to Holiday.

Beginning at the intersection of 4th Street N (US 92 and SR 687 and 5th Avenue N in St. Petersburg, Florida, it runs west of US 19 near the Gulf coast passing through the cities of Seminole, Clearwater, Dunedin and Tarpon Springs before ending at US 19 in Holiday, Pasco County, Florida.  It is also the unsigned State Road 595 throughout the entire route.  It also runs along much of the Pinellas Trail.

Albany business loop

U.S. Route 19 Business (US 19 Bus.) in Albany, Georgia is concurrent with US 82 Bus. and SR 520 Bus. for its entire length. It begins at exit 2B on the Liberty Expressway and joins westbound US 82 Bus and SR 520 Bus. From there, US 19 Bus./US 82 Bus./SR 520 Bus. turn north at SR 234, which briefly joins the concurrency. The three business routes continue to the north until they end at exit 6 which is the western end of the US 19/US 82 concurrency.
 The entire length of US 19 Bus. is part of the National Highway System, a system of routes determined to be the most important for the nation's economy, mobility, and defense.

Leesburg bypass route

U.S. Route 19 Bypass (US 19 Byp.) is a  western bypass of the city of Leesburg in Lee County, which was completed in 2009. It is concurrent with State Route 3 Bypass (SR 3 Byp.) and briefly with SR 32. The entire length of US 19 Byp. is part of the National Highway System, a system of routes determined to be the most important for the nation's economy, mobility, and defense.

Griffin business loop

U.S. Route 19 Business (US 19 Bus.) in Griffin, Georgia is concurrent with US 41 Bus. It begins at the intersection of US 19/US 41/SR 3/SR 7 and SR 155, and follows SR 155 north around Griffin-Spalding County Airport. Then it turns west at SR 16 until it curves onto SR 92 until finally ending at a wye interchange with US 19/US 41/SR 3. All of US 19 Bus. from the southern end of the SR 16 concurrency to the northern terminus is part of the National Highway System, a system of routes determined to be the most important for the nation's economy, mobility, and defense.

Dahlonega business loop

U.S. Route 19 Business (US 19 Bus.) in Dahlonega is concurrent with both Georgia State Route 9 (SR 9) and SR 52.

Murphy business loop

U.S. Route 19 Business is a  business route established in 1980 that replaced the original US 19 routing through the city of Murphy, along Hiwassee Street, Valley River Avenue, Hill Street, Andrews Road and Pleasant Valley Road.

Andrews business loop

U.S. Route 19 Business is a  business route established in 1979 replaced the original US 19 routing through the city of Andrews, along Main Street.

Bryson City–Lake Junaluska truck route

U.S. Route 19 Truck (US 19 Truck) is a truck route of US 19 located in Western North Carolina.  Its routing follows the former routing of US 19A (1976-1983) and US 19 Bypass (1983-1987) along the Great Smoky Mountains Expressway, between Bryson City and Lake Junaluska.   Signage appears only at the end points, with no reassurance signs along route.

Bryson City connector

U.S. Route 19 Connector (US 19 Conn) is a  connector route established in October 2011, that connects US 19 (Main Street) with US 74 (Great Smoky Mountains Expressway).  Also known as Veterans Boulevard, it was upgraded to primary status because of real need of maintenance and Swain County's secondary route budget was unable to support it.  The route is an undivided four-lane the entire length and serves as the main entrance to Bryson City.

Asheville business loop

U.S. Route 19 Business (US 19 Bus), established in 1960, is a  business route currently starts on Haywood Road then go north on I-26/I-240 (exit 2) back to the main US 19 (exit 3).  Historically, US 19 Business continued along Haywood Road, connecting to Clingman Avenue and then to Patton Avenue/US 19. In 1961, it extended over Patton Avenue through downtown Asheville when US 19 moved onto the East-West Freeway.  In 1962, it was rerouted to its current alignment from Haywood Road to Hanover Street (now I-26/I-240).  It is co-signed with US 23 Bus.

Weaverville business loop

U.S. Route 19 Business, established in September 1967, this  business route follows the original US 19 mainline through the city of Weaverville.  The business loop is clearly marked along the route, though the freeway bypass (I-26/US 19/US 23) does not mention it. It starts from exit 23 interchange (with a brief overlap with US 25), then goes north along Weaverville Road and Main Street; it reconnects with the freeway at the exit 18 interchange via Clarks Chapel Road/Monticello Road.

Bristol truck route

U.S. Route 19 Truck (US 19 Truck), which shares a complete concurrency with US 11 Truck, provides a bypass route for truckers avoiding the residential area of Euclid Avenue.

Lebanon business loop

Tazewell business loop

U.S. Route 19 Business (US 19 Business) is an eight-mile business route of US 460 in Tazewell, Virginia. It is co-signed with Bus US 460.

Prosperity alternate route

U.S. Route 19 Alternate (US 19 Alt.) is the internal designation for an unsigned route that connects U.S. Route 19 and West Virginia Route 16 to the West Virginia Turnpike (Interstates 64 and 77) on the northwest edge of Prosperity, West Virginia north of Beckley. The route is a limited access freeway throughout and comprises the first 1.5 miles (2.414 km) of Corridor L.

Fairmont spur route

U.S. Route 19 Spur (US 19 Spur) is the internal designation for an unsigned route that connects U.S. Route 19 and U.S. Route 250 in the southwestern portion of Fairmont, West Virginia. The route is known locally as Country Club Road.

Major intersections

Pittsburgh truck route

It is a loop off US 19; the southern terminus located in Mt. Lebanon and the northern terminus in McCandless Township, connecting to US 19 at both ends. The route is notable for a large, unorthodox interchange with the Penn–Lincoln Parkway (I-376/US 22/US 30) just west of the Fort Pitt Tunnel, where the route joins the Parkway and forms several wrong-way concurrencies, including one with its own opposing directions. The road then joins I-279 on its northward trek. The route exits parkway north at exit 4. Heading north past Pittsburgh, the road heads past shopping buildings, Ross Park Mall, and McCandless Crossing. North of Pittsburgh, U.S. Route 19 Truck is called McKnight Road and south of Pittsburgh it carries West Liberty Avenue and Washington Road.

Harlansburg truck route

U.S. Route 19 Truck is a truck route around a weight-restricted bridge over a branch of the Slippery Rock Creek on which trucks over 32 tons are prohibited.  The route follows Pennsylvania Route 108, Pennsylvania Route 388, Pennsylvania Route 168, and Pennsylvania Route 956.  The route was signed in 2013.

Former

Brooksville alternate route

U.S. Route 19 Alternate was a former segment of US 19 that ran from Bayonte Point to Brooksville, Florida, which only existed for one year. It ran along what is today State Road 52 from Bayonet Point to Gowers Corner, and then turned north along US 41 into Brooksville.

Thomasville–Meigs business loop

U.S. Route 19 Business (US 19 Bus.) was a business route of US 19 that originally existed from Thomasville to Meigs. The roadway that would eventually become US 19 Bus. was established at least as early as 1919 as part of SR 3 between the two cities. By the end of 1926, two segments of the highway had a "completed hard surface": a segment in the northern part of Thomasville and from approximately Ochlocknee to Meigs. A segment north-northwest of Thomasville had a "sand clay or top soil" surface. By the end of 1929, US 19 was designated on the then-current highway from Thomasville to Meigs.

By the middle of 1930, the entire segment of SR 3 that became US 19 Bus. had a completed hard surface. By the end of the year, the segment from the Florida state line to Thomasville was indicated to be under construction. In January 1932, the entire highway from Thomasville to Meigs had a completed hard surface. In 1934, a segment north-northwest of Thomasville was under construction. By June 1963, SR 333 was designated on US 19 between Thomasville and Meigs. SR 3's Thomasville–Meigs segment was shifted westward onto US 19 Bus. Its former path, on US 19, was redesignated as part of SR 333. By the end of 1965, the northern terminus of US 19 Bus. was truncated to just east of Ochlocknee. In 1982, all of SR 333 that remained was redesignated as SR 300. In 1986, US 19 Bus. was decommissioned.

Atlanta business loop

U.S. Route 19 Business (US 19 Bus.) was a business route of US 19 that existed in Clayton and Fulton counties. It partially traveled in Atlanta. At least as early as 1919, SR 3 traveled on essentially the same path as it currently does in the northern part of Clayton County and the southeastern part of Fulton County. By the end of 1926, US 41 had been designated on the entire length of SR 3 in these counties. The segment of the highway from just north-northwest of the Henry–Clayton county line to Marietta had a "completed hard surface". By the end of 1929, US 19 was designated on SR 3 in the two counties to the main part of Atlanta.

In 1953, US 19/US 41/SR 3 was shifted eastward onto the "Expressway" (the precursor of Interstate 75 (I-75)) in the southern part of Atlanta, traveled west on Lakewood Avenue, and then resumed the northern path. The former path became US 19 Bus./US 41 Bus. By the end of 1965, US 19/US 41/SR 3 was shifted onto the former path of US 19 Bus./US 41 Bus. in the Atlanta area.

Waynesville alternate route

U.S. Route 19 Alternate (US 19A) was routed through downtown Waynesville along with US 23A (today as US 23 Business).

Ela–Lake Junaluska alternate route

U.S. Route 19 Alternate (US 19A) was established in 1947, replacing part of NC 28, between Ela and Cherokee, and all of NC 293 between Cherokee and Lake Junaluska, via Soco Gap.  In 1948, US 19 and US 19A swapped routes.

Bryson City–Lake Junaluska alternate route

U.S. Route 19 Alternate (US 19A) was established in 1948 when US 19 swapped routes with the previous US 19A between Ela and Lake Junaluska, via Soco Gap.  US 19A followed the old alignment of US 19 from Ela, through Dillsboro, Sylva and Waynesville, to Lake Junaluska.  Between 1954 and 1957, US 19A/US 23 was placed onto current routing bypassing Balsam.  Between 1958 and 1962, US 19A/US 23 was placed on one-way streets through Sylva; northbound via Main Street and southbound via Mill Street.  In 1967, US 19A/US 23 was rerouted on new freeway bypass west of Waynesville; its old alignment becoming US 23 Bus.  In 1974, US 19A was placed on new freeway bypass north of Dillsboro and Sylva; its old alignment becoming US 23 Bus.  In 1975, the relocation around Sylva was submitted to AASHTO for approval, but was denied by the subcommittee; despite the denial, NCDOT left signage as is.  In 1976, US 19A was placed on new freeway bypass east of Bryson City, from Alarka Road to US 441; its old alignment from Ela to Whittier was downgraded to secondary road.  In 1982, NCDOT submitted a request to AASHTO to switch US 19 and US 19A between Bryson City and Lake Junaluska; but was later withdrawn before the vote.  In 1983, US 19A was redesignated US 19 Bypass; despite the change, signage along the route maintained US 19A during and after US 19 Bypass was also eliminated in 1987.

Bryson City–Lake Junaluska bypass

U.S. Route 19 Bypass (US 19 By-Pass) was established in 1983 as a redesignation of US 19A between Bryson City and Lake Junaluska; this also coincides with the establishment of the Great Smoky Mountains Expressway.  In 1987, US 19 Bypass was eliminated in favor for US 74, which was extended west of Asheville the prior year.  Despite being officially US 19 Bypass, signage along the route remained US 19A throughout, with some signs still marking the route until the mid-1990s.

Asheville alternate route

U.S. Route 19 Alternate (US 19A) was routed along Haywood Road through Asheville.  This route was re-branded as US 19 Business in 1960.

See also

References

External links

19
19
U.S. Route 19
19
19
19
19